First-seeded Lew Hoad defeated Ken Rosewall 6–4, 3–6, 6–4, 7–5 in the final to win the men's singles tennis title at the 1956 Australian Championships.

Seeds
The seeded players are listed below. Lew Hoad is the champion; others show the round in which they were eliminated.

 Lew Hoad (champion)
 Ken Rosewall (finalist)
 Herbie Flam (semifinals)
 Gilbert Shea (quarterfinals)
 Ashley Cooper (quarterfinals)
 Neale Fraser (semifinals)
 Mervyn Rose (quarterfinals)
 Mal Anderson (quarterfinals)

Draw

Key
 Q = Qualifier
 WC = Wild card
 LL = Lucky loser
 r = Retired

Finals

Earlier rounds

Section 1

Section 2

See also
 1956 Australian Championships – Women's singles

External links
 

1956
1956 in Australian tennis